Hamdon is an unrecognized Bedouin village in northern Israel. Located in the Galilee near Lotem, it falls under the jurisdiction of Misgav Regional Council.

See also
 Arab localities in Israel
 Bedouin in Israel

Arab villages in Israel
Bedouin localities in Israel
Populated places in Northern District (Israel)